Mutukaroa / Hamlins Hill Regional Park is a regional park situated in the Auckland suburb of Penrose in New Zealand's North Island. It is situated in Maungakiekie-Tāmaki, north-east of the Manukau Harbour and west of the Tāmaki River. The park is owned and operated by Auckland Council.

Geography

Mutukaroa / Hamlin Hill is the largest non-volcanic hill on the Auckland isthmus. It is formed from Waitemata sandstone, surrounded by much younger volcanic deposits. The hill is 65 metres high.

History

Mutukaroa is the site of one of the largest kāinga (undefended settlements) on the Tāmaki isthmus, surrounded by vast kūmara gardens. During the Waiohua period, the hill was a residence for Ngāi Tai, who continued to occupy the hill after Ngāti Whātua Ōrākei setled the isthmus in the 18th century.

The name Hamlin(s) Hill comes from James Hamlin, a reverend of the Church Missionary Society, who received the land as  part of a Crown land grant in the 1840s. For many years, the farmland on the hill was used as holding paddocks for the Westfield Freezing Works. The hill was planned for demolition in the 1960s, as a part of a plan to reclaim 30 hectares of land from the Manukau Harbour. The hill was saved after a public outcry and court action.

The hill was officially gazetted as Mutukaroa / Hamlin Hill in 2014.

Gallery

References 

Maungakiekie-Tāmaki Local Board Area
Parks in Auckland
Regional parks of New Zealand
Tourist attractions in the Auckland Region
Urban forests in New Zealand